William Mueller may refer to:
 Trevor Murdoch (William Theodore Mueller), American professional wrestler
 William A. Mueller, American sound engineer
 William Boyce Mueller, founder of Forgotten Scouts
 Bill Mueller, American baseball third baseman 
 Bill Mueller (outfielder), American baseball center fielder